Daviess County is a county located in the U.S. state of Missouri. As of the 2020 census, the population was 8,430. Its county seat is Gallatin. The county was organized December 29, 1836, from Ray County and named for Major Joseph Hamilton Daveiss, a soldier from Kentucky who was killed in 1811 at the Battle of Tippecanoe.

The county includes the town of Jamesport, which has the largest Amish community in Missouri.

History
According to Latter Day Saint movement founder Joseph Smith, Adam-ondi-Ahman, situated in the central part of the county, was where Adam and Eve relocated after being banished from the Garden of Eden. According to LDS tradition, the site is to be a gathering spot prior to the Second Coming of Jesus Christ.

In 1838, two years after the county was organized, Joseph Smith's claims about the history of the area spurred in an influx of Mormon settlers.  Non-Mormon residents feared they were going to lose control of the county and attempted to prevent Mormons from voting in the Gallatin Election Day Battle. This was to be the first skirmish in the Mormon War. Later, in retaliation for violence to their families and destruction of their property, some Mormons burned and sacked Gallatin, Grindstone Fork, Millport and other smaller settlements.  The plundered goods were deposited in the Bishop's storehouse at Diahman.  Millport, which at the time was the largest city in the county and the center for trade, never recovered, and became a ghost town.  Missouri Governor Lilburn Boggs issued an Extermination Order to drive the Mormons from the state after arresting Joseph Smith and other leaders of the church.

Daviess County played a major role in the history of the outlaw James-Younger Gang. The first confirmed bank robbery involving Jesse James occurred on December 7, 1869, at the Daviess County Savings Association in Gallatin. John W. Sheets, the bank cashier, was killed in the process by Jesse James, who believed Sheets was Samuel P. Cox, who had killed James's bushwhacker colleague Bloody Bill Anderson during the American Civil War. On July 15, 1881, the gang was believed to have been responsible for the robbery of the Rock Island Line at Winston in which a conductor and passenger were killed.

After Jesse James was murdered in St. Joseph, Frank James surrendered in 1882 to face Daviess County charges in connection with the train robbery/murder as well as murder charges in the 1869 bank robbery. Frank James was tried from August 20-September 6, 1883. Interest was so intense that the trial was moved to the Gallatin Opera House to accommodate the crowds. James was found not guilty of involvement in both crimes. Charges were made that the jury was filled with Southern sympathizers who refused to convict one of their own.

The Daviess County Savings Association and the Gallatin Opera House have since been torn down, although the Winston Rock Island Line train station still stands and is operated by the local historical society as a museum.

Daviess County has one of only three Rotary Jails still in existence. Also known as the "Squirrel Cage Jail,"  it is now a museum and is on the National Register of Historic Places.

Geography

Adjacent counties
Harrison County (north)
Grundy County (northeast)
Livingston County (southeast)
Caldwell County (south)
DeKalb County (west)
Gentry County (northwest)

Major highways
 Interstate 35
 U.S. Route 69
 Route 6
 Route 13
 Route 190

Demographics

As of the 2010 census, there were 8,433 people, 3,214 households, and 2,489 families residing in the county.  The population density was 15 people per square mile (6/km2).  There were 4,199 housing units at an average density of 7 per square mile (3/km2).  The racial makeup of the county was 98.02% White, 0.27% Black or African American, 0.38% Native American, 0.06% Asian, 0.02% Pacific Islander, 0.08% from other races, and 1.16% from two or more races. Approximately 1.03% of the population were Hispanic or Latino of any race.

There were 3,214 households, out of which 31.92% had children under the age of 18 living with them, 58.81% were married couples living together, 8.06% had a female householder with no husband present, and 28.34% were non-families. 24.64% of all households were made up of individuals, and 10.89% had someone living alone who was 65 years of age or older.  The average household size was 2.58 and the average family size was 3.06.

In the county, the population was spread out, with 26.70% under the age of 18, 7.02% from 18 to 24, 21.81% from 25 to 44, 27.38% from 45 to 64, and 17.09% who were 65 years of age or older.  The median age was 40 years. For every 100 females there were 98.80 males.  For every 100 females age 18 and over, there were 98.30 males.

The median income for a household in the county was $39,925, and the median income for a family was $48,839. Males had a median income of $33,882 versus $28,891 for females. The per capita income for the county was $19,900.  About 9.80% of families and 13.80% of the population were below the poverty line, including 18.50% of those under age 18 and 11.60% of those age 65 or over.

Religion
According to the Association of Religion Data Archives County Membership Report (2010), Daviess County is sometimes regarded as being on the northern edge of the Bible Belt, with evangelical Protestantism being the most predominant religion. The most predominant denominations among residents in Daviess County who adhere to a religion are Southern Baptists (30.78%), Disciples of Christ (9.12%), and Amish groups (7.07%).

2020 Census

Education
Of adults 25 years of age and older in Daviess County, 84.0% possess a high school diploma or higher, while 14.4% hold a bachelor's degree or higher as their highest educational attainment.

Public schools
Gallatin R-V School District - Gallatin
Covel D. Searcy Elementary School (PK-04)
Gallatin Middle School (05-08)
Gallatin High School (09-12)
North Daviess County R-III School District - Jameson
North Daviess County Elementary School (PK-06) - Jameson
North Daviess County High School (07-12) - Jameson
Pattonsburg R-II School District - Pattonsburg
Pattonsburg Elementary School (PK-06)
Pattonsburg High School (07-12)
Tri-County R-VII School District - Jamesport
Tri-County Elementary School (K-06)
Tri-County High School (07-12)
Winston R-VI School District - Winston
Winston Elementary School (PK-06)
Winston High School (07-12)

Private schools
Country View School - Jamesport - (01-08) - Amish
Hickory Hill School - Jamesport - (01-08) - Amish
Jamesport Mennonite School - Jamesport - (01-08) - Mennonite
Meadow View School - Jamesport - (01-07) Amish
Oak Grove School - Jamesport - (01-08) - Amish
Spring Hill School - Jamesport - (01-08) - Amish
Walnut Creek School - Jamesport - (01-08) - Amish

Public libraries
Daviess County Library

Politics

Local
Politics are divided at the local level in Daviess County. Republicans hold a majority of the elected positions in the county.

State

All of Daviess County is a part of Missouri's 2nd District in the Missouri House of Representatives and is currently represented by J. Eggleston (R-Maysville). Eggleston was reelected to a fourth term in 2020.

All of Daviess County is a part of Missouri's 12th District in the Missouri Senate and is currently represented by Dan Hegeman (R-Cosby). Hegeman won a second term in 2018.

Federal
All of Daviess County is included in Missouri's 6th Congressional District and is currently represented by Sam Graves (R-Tarkio) in the U.S. House of Representatives. Graves was elected to an eleventh term in 2020 over Democratic challenger Gena Ross.

Daviess County, along with the rest of the state of Missouri, is represented in the U.S. Senate by Josh Hawley (R-Columbia) and Roy Blunt (R-Strafford).

Blunt was elected to a second term in 2016 over then-Missouri Secretary of State Jason Kander.

Political culture

At the presidential level, Daviess County has become solidly Republican in recent years. Daviess County strongly favored Donald Trump in both 2016 and 2020. Bill Clinton was the last Democratic presidential nominee to carry Daviess County in 1996 with a plurality of the vote, and a Democrat hasn't won majority support from the county's voters in a presidential election since Jimmy Carter in 1976.

Like most rural areas throughout northwest Missouri, voters in Daviess County generally adhere to socially and culturally conservative principles which tend to influence their Republican leanings, at least on the state and national levels. In 2004, Missourians voted on a constitutional amendment to define marriage as the union between a man and a woman—it overwhelmingly passed in Daviess County with 79.58% of the vote. The initiative passed with 71% support from voters statewide. In 2006, Missourians voted on a constitutional amendment to fund and legalize embryonic stem cell research in the state—it failed in Daviess County with 50.96% voting against the measure. The initiative narrowly passed the state with 51% of support from voters as Missouri became one of the first states in the nation to approve embryonic stem cell research. Despite Daviess County's longstanding tradition of supporting socially conservative platforms, voters in the county have a penchant for advancing populist causes like increasing the minimum wage. In 2006, Missourians voted on a proposition (Proposition B) to increase the minimum wage in the state to $6.50 an hour—it passed Daviess County with 68.25% of the vote. The proposition strongly passed every single county in Missouri with 78.99% voting in favor. (During the same election, voters in five other states also strongly approved increases in the minimum wage.) In 2018, Missourians voted on a proposition (Proposition A) concerning right to work, the outcome of which ultimately reversed the right to work legislation passed in the state the previous year. 62.93% of Daviess County voters cast their ballots to overturn the law.

Missouri presidential preference primaries

2020
The 2020 presidential primaries for both the Democratic and Republican parties were held in Missouri on March 10. On the Democratic side, former Vice President Joe Biden (D-Delaware) both won statewide and carried Daviess County by a wide margin. Biden went on to defeat President Donald Trump in the general election.

Incumbent President Donald Trump (R-Florida) faced a primary challenge from former Massachusetts Governor Bill Weld, but won both Daviess County and statewide by overwhelming margins.

2016
The 2016 presidential primaries for both the Republican and Democratic parties were held in Missouri on March 15. Businessman Donald Trump (R-New York) narrowly won the state overall, but carried a majority of the vote in Daviess County. He went on to win the presidency.

On the Democratic side, former Secretary of State Hillary Clinton (D-New York) both won statewide and carried Daviess County by a small margin.

2012
The 2012 Missouri Republican Presidential Primary's results were nonbinding on the state's national convention delegates. Voters in Daviess County supported former U.S. Senator Rick Santorum (R-Pennsylvania), who finished first in the state at large, but eventually lost the nomination to former Governor Mitt Romney (R-Massachusetts). Delegates to the congressional district and state conventions were chosen at a county caucus, which selected a delegation favoring Santorum. Incumbent President Barack Obama easily won the Missouri Democratic Primary and renomination. He defeated Romney in the general election.

2008
In 2008, the Missouri Republican Presidential Primary was closely contested, with Senator John McCain (R-Arizona) prevailing and eventually winning the nomination.

Then-Senator Hillary Clinton (D-New York) received more votes than any candidate from either party in Daviess County during the 2008 presidential primary. Despite initial reports that Clinton had won Missouri, Barack Obama (D-Illinois), also a Senator at the time, narrowly defeated her statewide and later became that year's Democratic nominee, going on to win the presidency.

Communities

Cities
Coffey
Gallatin (county seat)
Gilman City
Jamesport
Pattonsburg

Villages
Altamont
Jameson
Lock Springs
Winston

Census-designated place
Lake Viking

Unincorporated communities

 Alta Vista
 Bancroft
 Carlow
 Civil Bend
 Mabel
 Old Pattonsburg

Notable people

Phog Allen - University of Kansas coach, called the "Father of Basketball Coaching."
Conrad Burns - U.S. Senator (R-Montana), (1989-2007)
Webster Davis - Mayor of Kansas City, (1894-1895)
Alexander Monroe Dockery - Governor of Missouri, (1901-1905)
Brice Garnett - Professional golfer
Larry Holley - Head men's basketball coach at William Jewell College
William Thornton Kemper, Sr. - Patriarch of the Missouri Kemper financial family
Jerry Litton - U.S. Representative, (1973-1976)
Johnny Ringo - outlaw who briefly lived in the area
Martha Scott - Academy Award-nominated actress
Wild Bill Elliott - Hollywood western movie actor, best known for role as "Red Ryder"

See also
National Register of Historic Places listings in Daviess County, Missouri

References

External links

Daviess County Sheriff's Office
 Digitized 1930 Plat Book of Daviess County  from University of Missouri Division of Special Collections, Archives, and Rare Books

 
Missouri counties
Significant places in Mormonism
1836 establishments in Missouri
Populated places established in 1836